Petar Snačić (commonly misspelt Petar Svačić) was a feudal lord, notable for being one of the claimants of the Croatian throne between c. 1093 and 1097. It is assumed that he began as a ban serving under king Demetrius Zvonimir of Croatia and was then elected king by the Croatian feudal lords in 1093. Petar's seat of power was based in Knin. His rule was marked by a struggle for control of the country with Coloman of Hungary, dying at the Battle of Gvozd Mountain in 1097.

Background
Early scholars, specifically Franjo Rački misread the letter "n" as a "v", creating a mistake which is common until today. There never existed a Svačić family, yet there was the Snačić family who were one of the twelve noble tribes of Croatia, and certain Petar Snačić is mentioned in Supetar Cartulary (14th century addition) as Croatian ban during the rule of King Zvonimir. However the connection between Petar and this Petar Snačić is disputed, as is the attempt by Ferdo Šišić to relate him to Petar Slaven, son of Slavac who was also a pretender to the throne.

Struggle for the succession

He assumed the throne amid deep tension throughout the Kingdom. His predecessor, Stephen II (1089–1091) died without leaving an heir, sparking a major political crisis. Jelena or Ilona, the widow of King Dmitar Zvonimir (1074–1089) supported her brother, King Ladislaus I of Hungary, in the inheritance of the throne of Croatia. Croatia was invaded in 1091 by Ladislaus I, encountering opposition only upon reaching mountain Gvozd, where he successfully engaged in warfare with the local nobility. Meanwhile, as a part of Croatia's dignitaries and clergy did not support Ladislaus' claim, they elected nobleman Petar as king.

Shortly after his army's success, Ladislaus died (1095), leaving his nephew Coloman to continue the campaign. In 1097, Petar departed from Knin to meet Coloman in battle, resulting in Coloman's victory and Petar's death. According to Pacta conventa, whose authenticity is debated, a historic settlement was subsequently reached by which the Croats agreed to recognize Coloman as king. In return, he promised to guarantee Croatia's self-governance under a ban (royal governor), and to respect all the rights, laws and privileges of the Croatian Kingdom. Petar was the last native king of Croatia, and the personal union with Kingdom of Hungary lasted until 1918.

References

Petar Snacic
Petar Snacic
Petar Snacic
Petar Snacic
Roman Catholic monarchs
Military personnel killed in action
Monarchs killed in action
11th-century monarchs in Europe
Year of birth unknown
11th-century Croatian people